Chesma (or Chesme, Cesme, from the Turkish Çeşme) may refer to:
Cheshmeh, West Azerbaijan (also known as Cheshma), a village in Iran
Chesma (mythology), a fountain-spirit or nymph in Turkish mythology
Çeşme, a small town in Turkey
Chesma Bay, near Çeşme
Battle of Chesma, fought in Chesma Bay in 1770
 Four monuments built by Catherine the Great to commemorate this battle:
Chesme Church
Chesme Column, in Tsarskoye Selo (1778)
Chesma Obelisk, in Gatchina (1775)
Chesma Palace, in Saint Petersburg (1774–1777)
Chesma (ship), name of several ships of the Imperial Russian Navy
Chesma (rural locality), a rural locality (a selo) in Chesmensky District of Chelyabinsk Oblast, Russia

See also
Česma, a river in Croatia
Chashma (disambiguation)
Cheshma (disambiguation)
Cheshmeh (disambiguation)